PerlMonks is a community website covering all aspects of Perl programming and other related topics such as web applications and system administration. It is often referred to by users as 'The Monastery'.
The name PerlMonks, and the general style of the website, is designed to both humorously reflect the almost religious zeal that programmers sometimes have for their favorite language, and also to engender an atmosphere of calm reflection and consideration for other users.

Users (referred to as monks) create discussion topics which other monks can reply to and vote as good or bad. Users have an experience rating (XP) that roughly measures their participation in the PerlMonks website as perceived by the other monks, not necessarily their proficiency in the Perl language. All monks have a 'home node', providing profile information and an area for Monks to personalize.

Notable members include the creator of the Perl language, the authors of several well-known Perl books
and the authors of numerous CPAN modules. CPAN authors frequently promote and provide support for their modules
at PerlMonks.

Features 
The site has tutorials, reviews, Q&A, poetry, obfuscated code, as well as sections for code snippets and entire scripts and modules.

Generally, the section of the site with the most traffic is Seekers of Perl Wisdom, where users of all experience levels ask Perl-related questions.  Some questions are from beginners trying to understand the basics of the language, while others are from seasoned veterans looking for methods to improve upon algorithms or to optimize performance.  Those who provide answers are also of varying experience levels.

Much of the site's content consists of specific code examples.  Some of these examples are for Perl's core features, as documented on the official Perl documentation website (http://perldoc.perl.org).  Other examples are for the Comprehensive Perl Archive Network (CPAN), which is a repository for Perl libraries (known as modules) that are not part of the core Perl distribution.

The code that the site runs on is a much hacked fork of an early version of the Everything Engine and was created by Nathan Oostendorp as part of Blockstackers Intergalactic — the firm that also ran Slashdot. As a result, PerlMonks has many features in common with both Everything2 and Slashdot like its strong emphasis placed on user feedback.

Another feature that PerlMonks retains from Everything is the Chatterbox, which is a text chat area at the side of every page. Logged-in users can type in anything they want, and it appears for all users to see. Talk in the chatterbox is often Perl related, and various tools (written in Perl) have been written to improve the chatterbox experience. Some come to PerlMonks primarily for the chatterbox. Others find the chatterbox distracting and turn it off.

References

External links
 http://www.perlmonks.org/

Perl
Computing websites
Modularity